The Princely Abbey of Stavelot-Malmedy, also Principality of Stavelot-Malmedy, sometimes known with its German name Stablo, was an ecclesiastical principality of the Holy Roman Empire. Princely power was exercised by the Benedictine abbot of the imperial double monastery of Stavelot and Malmedy, founded in 651.

As a prince-abbot, the abbot of Stavelot-Malmedy sat on the Ecclesiastical Bench of the College of Ruling Princes of the Imperial Diet alongside the prince-bishops. Along with the handful of other prince-abbots, he cast a full vote, in contrast to the majority of imperial abbots who were only entitled to collectively determine the votes of their respective curial benches.

Both are currently parts of the Kingdom of Belgium—since the 1830 Belgian Revolution and the 1919 Treaty of Versailles, respectively.

History

Establishment 

A charter of Sigebert III, king of Austrasia entrusted Remaclus with the monasteries of both Stavelot and Malmedy, which was located a few kilometres eastwards in the  forest, "a place of horror and solitary isolation which abounds with wild beasts". Sigebert granted forest land; charged his Mayor of the Palace, Grimoald the Elder, with furnishing money to build the two monasteries; and continued to foster these communities with personal gifts.

The site of Malmedy was probably already settled before the foundation of the abbey, despite etymology seeming to indicate Malmedy's unsuitability.  was "a place with winding waters", or, most probably, a "bad confluency". The  was partially canalised and its banks strengthened, to prevent the flooding that Malmedy often experienced.  The abbey church in Malmedy was dedicated to St Benedict.
The monastery of Malmedy is considered by historians and hagiographers to be slightly older than the monastery of Stavelot, with the town claiming its foundation date as 648. Malmedy is listed on earlier maps than Stavelot, and the commission appointed in 670 by Childeric II, in order to delimit the abbey territory, started from Malmedy. Afterwards, the territory of the abbey was enlarged westwards, so that Stavelot became the geographical centre and the capital of the principality.

The first church in Stavelot was built by abbot Godwin and, on 25 June 685, was dedicated to saints Martin, Peter, and Paul. The relics of Saint Remaclus were housed in this new church.

Development and the High Middle Ages 

In 747, Carloman, Duke of the Franks and Mayor of the Palace of Austrasia, enlarged the abbeys' lands with gifts from his own, on his abdication. Throughout the ninth century, the abbeys played an important cultural role in Lotharingia, particularly thanks to abbot Christian.

Through the seventh and eighth centuries, the two abbeys followed their mission of evangelism, along with forest clearance. With the decline of the Carolingian Empire, however, the abbeys suffered the same decay as elsewhere, leaving the principality in the custody of lay abbots—temporal guardians—from 844 to 938, including Ebbo, archbishop of Rheims, Adalard the Seneschal, and Reginar and Giselbert, dukes of Lorraine.

Welcoming pilgrims and the sick was a part of the monks' mission. On 13 April 862, Lothair II of Lotharingia, while dealing with the distribution of property , ordered that local tithes be paid to the hospital , an order he confirmed on 10 June 873.

In December 881, Normans, including Godfrid, Duke of Frisia, invaded the area, burning both abbeys and causing the monks to flee with their treasures and relics. Several historical sources provide evidence of the raid of 881, which was well prepared and organised. Relics from Aachen, which had been entrusted to the monks at Stavelot because of the Norman threat, were returned intact.

After the invasions, abbot Odilon began to rebuild the ruined abbey of Stavelot, with support from bishops of —including Notker, the first prince-bishop. The abbots Odilon and Werinfride rebuilt the abbeys, with new building; re-established the monastic community; re-organised the principality. By the time of the Ottonian dynasty in the early 10th century, the abbeys were once again of suitable Imperial stature. A new abbey church was built in Malmedy in 992, dedicated to St Quirinus; in 1007, a parish church was consecrated to Saint Gereon.

Another danger threatened the abbey—and the Western Empire—in the 10th century: the Hungarian invasions. Having been deposed as duke of Lotharingia, Conrad the Red invited the Hungarians to undermine his opponents, Bruno the Great, archbishop of Cologne, and Reginar III, Count of Hainaut. The  reports:  ["In the year 954, Hungarians ravage the regions of Gaul ... In the year 955, victory over the Hungarians"].

The key building period at the abbey of Stavelot corresponds to the rule of prince-abbot Poppo of Deinze, the second founder of the abbey, who was made abbot by Holy Roman Emperor Henry II in 1020. Thietmar was the lay patron who assembled carpenters and stonemasons to build the abbey church. As well as confirming the authenticity of the relics of St Quirinus at Malmedy in 1042, Poppo revived the cult of St Remaclus. Poppo died in 1048; his cult, which began almost immediately, focused on his resting place in the crypt. Malmedy developed around the monastery; until the end of the tenth century, the villagers used the chapel of Saint Laurent, an apsidiole of the abbey church, as their place of worship.

This occurred despite several previous Imperial bulls reinforcing the position that the two abbeys should be subject to a single abbot. The monks from Stavelot processed to Malmedy with the crosier and relics of St Remaclus to remind the rebellious monks of the traditional ordering of the abbeys that the saint had instituted. The relics and crosier were also transported to an Imperial Diet of Henry IV in Goslar. In 1066, they processed again, this time to Aachen and Fritzlar; they processed to Bitburg and Bamberg the following year. That their prayers were not answered apparently led the monks to despair that the relics were becoming impotent or that the monks were being punished by their patron; in 1067 and 1068, abbot Thierry even went to Rome to appeal to Pope Alexander II. This impasse lasted for a further three years, until Henry held court at Liège during Easter in 1071; with great ceremony, the monks processed with Remaclus's relics to meet with his legendary fellow bishop St Lambert, joined en route by the relics of St Symmetrus. Numerous miracles convinced the emperor to recognise the union of the two abbeys and reiterate the superiority of Stavelot, forcing Anno eventually to capitulate. A rejoiceful procession back to Stavelot paused en route to celebrate Mass on the banks of the Meuse; finally, the monks processed with Remaclus's relics to the abbey at Malmedy, to symbolise the restoration of his and their authority. This series of episodes is recounted in the heroic narrative of the Triumph of St Remaclus and confirmed by several contemporary sources.

Elected prince-abbot in 1130, he played a key role in the religious life of the region and the abbeys. In the 12th to 15th centuries, however, the abbacy experienced a slow decline. In the 14th and 15th centuries, several Imperial edicts, initially issued by Emperor Charles IV, put the abbacy under the protection of the counts of Luxembourg.

Early Modern Age 
In 1521, after the castle in  had been dismantled, William added "Count of " to the abbots' titles, with the county representing most of the western portion of the principality's territory.

The abbey church served as a monastic church and as a church of pilgrimage until the French Revolution. Its imposing gatehouse tower was rebuilt in 1534; (its ground floor and some further foundation still remain). Malmedy began to flourish particularly in the 16th century with the development of tannery; in 1544 there were only 216 houses with a thousand inhabitants, but that more than tripled by 1635.

In the 17th century, Stavelot and Malmedy were major centres of tanning in Europe. Papermaking was particularly important to Malmedy, as was the manufacture of gunpowder. Other industries included cotton manufacturing, manufacture of chess sets and dominoes, and gingerbread baking. In 1659, a Capuchin convent was built in Stavelot.

In Stavelot, the entire town, including over 360 houses, was destroyed, leaving just the abbey and its farmyard standing. In Malmedy, some 600 out of the 660 houses of the town were destroyed and it took more than a century to completely rebuild. Malmedy's 1601 city walls had previously been destroyed by French troops in 1658, during the 1635–59 Franco-Spanish War. The wars—and passage by troops of Brandenburg-Prussia, the Dutch Republic, France, and —had cost the principality the sum of 2.75 million . The abbey had to borrow 134 000 thalers from Liège and Verviers; another loan, shared amongst the communities, totalled 109 000 thalers, with annual interest of 14 161 thalers and arrears of 26 000 thalers.

By the start of the 18th century the principality had lost a third of its territory, as a result of war, fires, pillage, and unjust encroachments. The deputies to the Imperial Diet complained that, in the 16th century, the Spanish Netherlands had seized several territories and that the Bishopric of  had stolen over half a dozen  totalling over 2000 households; adding that the principality itself retained only 1693 households, having had 3780 households before the upheavals and that the suffering of the principality had caused some of the richest and most powerful families to emigrate.

Abolition 

During the French Revolutionary Wars, from 1793 to 1804, the abbey was abandoned by the monks and the principality extinguished. Stavelot abbey itself was sacked and the church sold and demolished; of the church just the western doorway remains, as a free-standing tower. Two cloisters—one secular, one for the monks—survive as the courtyards of the brick-and-stone 17th-century domestic ranges. The foundations of the abbey church are presented as a footprint, with walls and column bases that enable the visitor to visualize the scale of the Romanesque abbey.

Geography and administration 

Several sources note that there were disputes between the two abbeys, with Stavelot assuming primacy over Malmedy, to the latter's discontent; though new abbots were invested in Stavelot on behalf of both abbeys. Each of the three districts had its own provincial assembly and court, with a Princely Council for highly contested cases.

Shortly before the principality's extinction, it contributed just over 81 Reichsthaler per session for the maintenance of the Imperial Chamber Court, from annual revenues of around 25 000 Rhenish guilder.

Art 
The abbeys at Stavelot and Malmedy commissioned some of the finest surviving works of Mosan art, one of the leading schools of Romanesque art, especially in goldsmith metalwork, which was then the most prestigious art form. Their collections were dispersed by wars and, finally, the French Revolution. Works from the abbeys are now in museums across the world. The illuminated manuscript Stavelot Bible (now in the British Library) was probably the abbey's main bible, and was created there by several hands over a four-year period ending in 1097 (other works have been identified as being from the same scriptorium). The bible has been described as "a perfect microcosm of the influences and interests that gave rise to the first Romanesque painting".  A group of manuscripts from the less productive scriptorium at Malmedy were donated to the Vatican Library in 1816 by Pope Pius VII, including the Malmedy Bible and two lectionaries from about 1300. Malmedy illuminations show a particular closeness with metalwork styles.

Abbot Wibald (ruled 1130–58) was an important Imperial minister and diplomat, and was regarded as one of the greatest patrons of Mosan art in its best period, although much of the evidence for this is circumstantial. Several important commissions were certainly placed by Wibald with Mosan workshops of goldsmiths and metalworkers, and other works later connected with Stavelot are also presumed to have been commissioned by him.

Coat of arms 
The coat of arms granted to the town of Stavelot, in 1819, is also that of the abbey—parted fesswise between an image of St Remaclus and the wolf, which in Stavelot's founding legend carried bricks for the building of the abbey after having killed Remaclus's donkey.

See also
 List of Carolingian monasteries
 Carolingian architecture

References 
 This article makes use of the articles ,  and Malmedy from the French Wikipedia and the article Stavelot on the English Wikipedia.

External links 

 Official website of Stavelot Abbey
 History of Malmedy

Imperial abbeys
651 establishments
States and territories established in the 650s
Geographic history of Belgium
Lower Rhenish-Westphalian Circle
Principality of Stavelot-Malmedy
Principality of Stavelot-Malmedy
Principalities of the Holy Roman Empire
Prince-bishoprics of the Holy Roman Empire in Belgium
Southern Netherlands